This is a list of 126 species in Saropogon, a genus of robber flies in the family Asilidae.

Saropogon species

 Saropogon abbreviatus Johnson, 1903 i g b
 Saropogon aberrans Loew, 1857 c g
 Saropogon albicans Janssens, 1961 c g
 Saropogon albifrons Back, 1904 i c g
 Saropogon alternatus Loew, 1873 c g
 Saropogon antipodus Schiner, 1868 c g
 Saropogon aretalogus Seguy, 1953 c g
 Saropogon atricolor Loew, 1857 c g
 Saropogon aurifrons (Macquart, 1849) c g
 Saropogon axillaris Loew, 1851 c g
 Saropogon beckeri Villeneuve, 1922 c g
 Saropogon bijani Abbassian-Lintzen, 1964 c g
 Saropogon birdi Curran, 1931 i c g
 Saropogon bryanti Wilcox, 1966 i c g b
 Saropogon castaneicornis (Macquart, 1838) c g
 Saropogon celaenopterus Janssens, 1968 c g
 Saropogon chathamensis Hutton, 1901 c g
 Saropogon clarkii Hutton, 1901 c g
 Saropogon clausus Becker, 1906 c g
 Saropogon combustus Loew, 1874 i c g
 Saropogon comosus Loew, 1869 c g
 Saropogon coquilletti Back, 1909 c g b
 Saropogon coquillettii Back, 1909 i
 Saropogon dasynotus Loew, 1871 c g
 Saropogon discus (Walker, 1849) c g
 Saropogon dispar Coquillett, 1902 i c g b
 Saropogon dissimulans White, 1918 c g
 Saropogon distinctus Becker, 1906 c g
 Saropogon dubiosus Theodor, 1980 c g
 Saropogon ehrenbergii Loew, 1851 c g
 Saropogon elbaiensis Efflatoun, 1937 c g
 Saropogon eucerus (Loew, 1847) c g
 Saropogon extenuatus Hutton, 1901 c g
 Saropogon fascipes Hutton, 1902 c g
 Saropogon flavicinctus (Wiedemann, 1820) c g
 Saropogon flavofacialis Hull, 1956 c g
 Saropogon fletcheri Bromley, 1934 i c g
 Saropogon frontalis Loew, 1869 c g
 Saropogon fucatus Loew, 1869 c g
 Saropogon fugiens Hutton, 1901 c g
 Saropogon fulvicornis (Macquart, 1850) c
 Saropogon fulvus Theodor, 1980 c g
 Saropogon galilaeus Theodor, 1980 c g
 Saropogon geniculatus Loew, 1869 c g
 Saropogon gigas Becker & Stein, 1913 c g
 Saropogon greatheadi Londt, 1997 c g
 Saropogon hispanicus Strobl, 1906 c g
 Saropogon hudsoni Hutton, 1901 c g
 Saropogon hulli Joseph & Parui, 1981 c g
 Saropogon hyalinus Coquillett, 1904 i c g
 Saropogon hypomelas (Loew, 1866) i c g b
 Saropogon incisuratus Wulp, 1899 c g
 Saropogon jucundus (Wulp, 1872) c g
 Saropogon jugulum (Loew, 1847) c g
 Saropogon kenyensis Londt, 1997 c g
 Saropogon lamperti Becker, 1906 c g
 Saropogon laparoides Bromley, 1951 i c g
 Saropogon latecinctus Becker, 1906 c g
 Saropogon leucocephalus (Meigen, 1820) c g
 Saropogon leucogenus Seguy, 1953 c g
 Saropogon lhoti Seguy, 1938 c g
 Saropogon limbinevris (Macquart, 1855) c g
 Saropogon londti Parui, 1999 c g
 Saropogon longicornis (Macquart, 1838) c g
 Saropogon luctuosus (Wiedemann, 1820) c g
 Saropogon luteus Coquillett, 1904 i c g b
 Saropogon maculipennis (Brunetti, 1928) c g
 Saropogon maroccanus Seguy, 1930 c g
 Saropogon meghalayensis Parui, 1999 c g
 Saropogon megriensis Richter, 1966 c g
 Saropogon melampygus (Loew, 1851) c g
 Saropogon melanophrus Bigot, 1878 c g
 Saropogon mellipes Bromley, 1934 c g
 Saropogon mofidii Abbassian-Lintzen, 1964 c g
 Saropogon mohawki Wilcox, 1966 i c g b
 Saropogon monachus Janssens, 1960 c g
 Saropogon nepalensis Parui, 1999 c g
 Saropogon nigritarsus Hull, 1956 c g
 Saropogon nigriventris Frey, 1958 c g
 Saropogon nigronasutum Bigot, 1878 c g
 Saropogon nitidus Wilcox, 1966 i c g b
 Saropogon notatus Loew, 1869 c g
 Saropogon obesulus Loew, 1869 c g
 Saropogon obscuripennis (Macquart, 1849) c g
 Saropogon olivierii (Macquart, 1838) c
 Saropogon perlatus Costa, 1884 c g
 Saropogon philocalus Seguy, 1941 c g
 Saropogon pittoproctus Loew, 1873 c g
 Saropogon platynotus (Loew, 1847) c g
 Saropogon pollinosus Loew, 1869 c g
 Saropogon pritchardi Bromley, 1934 i c g b
 Saropogon proximus Hutton, 1901 c g
 Saropogon pseudojugulum Theodor, 1980 c g
 Saropogon pulcherimus Williston, 1901 c g
 Saropogon pulverulentus Wulp, 1899 c g
 Saropogon punctipennis Frey, 1958 c g
 Saropogon purus Curran, 1930 i c g b
 Saropogon revivensis Theodor, 1980 c g
 Saropogon rubricosus Bezzi, 1916 c g
 Saropogon rubriventris Wulp, 1899 c g
 Saropogon rufipes (Gimmerthal, 1847) c g
 Saropogon scalaris Bigot, 1878 c g
 Saropogon semirubra Meijere, 1914 c g
 Saropogon semiustus Coquillett, 1904 i c g
 Saropogon senex Osten Sacken, 1887 i c g
 Saropogon sodalis Loew, 1869 c g
 Saropogon solus Bromley, 1951 i c g
 Saropogon specularis Bezzi, 1916 c g
 Saropogon srilankaensis Joseph & Parui, 1995 c g
 Saropogon subauratus (Walker, 1854) c g
 Saropogon tassilaensis Seguy, 1953 c g
 Saropogon thailandensis Tomasovic & Grootaert, 2003 c g
 Saropogon tiberiadis Theodor, 1980 c g
 Saropogon ticinense Bezzi, 1892 c g
 Saropogon tigris Parui, 1999 c g
 Saropogon treibensis Theodor, 1980 c g
 Saropogon trispiculum Tomasovic, 2005 c g
 Saropogon varians Bigot, 1888 c g
 Saropogon velutinus Carrera & Papavero, 1962 c g
 Saropogon verticalis Oldroyd, 1958 c g
 Saropogon vestitus (Wiedemann, 1828) c g
 Saropogon viduus (Walker, 1849) c g
 Saropogon weissi Bezzi, 1910 c g
 Saropogon wilcoxi Papavero, 1971 c g
 Saropogon zinidi Londt, 1997 c g
 Saropogon zopheropterus Janssens, 1969 c g

Data sources: i = ITIS, c = Catalogue of Life, g = GBIF, b = Bugguide.net

References

Saropogon
Articles created by Qbugbot